Mayda Doris Henderson (3 February 1928 – 3 September 2015, in Cape Town) was a South African botanist, phytogeographer, and taxonomist. She studied at Rhodes University and was best known for her articles published in Kirkia; The Zimbabwe Journal of Botany.  She was the recipient of a Southern Africa Medal.

 She was active as a taxonomist from 1954 to 1963.

Selected publications

Sources

References 

1928 births
2015 deaths
20th-century South African botanists
South African taxonomists
South African women botanists
20th-century South African women scientists